Simone Buti (born 19 September 1983) is an Italian volleyball player, a member of the Italy men's national volleyball team and Gi Group Monza, silver medalist of the 2015 World Cup, medalist of the European Championship (silver in 2011, bronze in 2015), medalist of the World League.

Sporting achievements

CEV Champions League
  2016/2017 - with Sir Sicoma Colussi Perugia

National team
 2011  CEV European Championship
 2014  FIVB World League
 2015  FIVB World Cup
 2015  CEV European Championship
 2016  Olympic Games

External links

 FIVB profile
 LegaVolley player profile
 
 
 

1983 births
Living people
People from Fucecchio
Italian men's volleyball players
Blu Volley Verona players
Umbria Volley players
Olympic volleyball players of Italy
Volleyball players at the 2016 Summer Olympics
Medalists at the 2016 Summer Olympics
Olympic silver medalists for Italy
Olympic medalists in volleyball
Middle blockers
Sportspeople from the Metropolitan City of Florence